Shediac Bridge Airport  is a private airfield located  south of Shediac Bridge-Shediac River in New Brunswick, Canada.

References

Registered aerodromes in New Brunswick
Transport in Westmorland County, New Brunswick
Buildings and structures in Westmorland County, New Brunswick